Now Here is Nowhere is the debut studio album by American rock band Secret Machines. It was released on May 18, 2004. The songs on the album are reminiscent of Pink Floyd and Led Zeppelin, with krautrock and shoegazing influences.

Track listing
"First Wave Intact" – 9:00
"Sad and Lonely" – 4:40
"The Leaves Are Gone" – 4:04
"Nowhere Again" – 4:16
"The Road Leads Where It's Led" – 4:41
"Pharaoh's Daughter" – 5:45
"You Are Chains" – 5:49
"Light's On" – 3:30
"Now Here is Nowhere" – 8:52

Personnel 
Brandon Curtis - vocals, bass guitar, keyboard
Benjamin Curtis - guitar, backing vocals
Josh Garza - drums

References

2004 debut albums
Secret Machines albums